Maria Maddalena or Santa Maria Maddalena may refer to:

 Mary Magdalene, St. Mary the Apostle
 Archduchess Maria Maddalena of Austria (1589–1631), Grand Duchess of Tuscany 
 Maria Maddalena de' Medici (1600–1633), Tuscan princess
 Maddalena de' Medici (1473–1528)

See also 
 Santa Maria Maddalena (disambiguation)
Maria Maddalena de' Pazzi (disambiguation)
 Maria Magdalena (disambiguation)
 Mary Magdalene (disambiguation)
 Marie-Madeleine (disambiguation)
 Maria-Magdalena (disambiguation)
Maria (disambiguation)
Maddalena (disambiguation)